"Bull Session with the 'Big Daddy'" is a recording by American rock band the Beach Boys that closes their 1965 album The Beach Boys Today!. The track is one of the few non-musical tracks released on the band's studio albums, the others being Cassius' Love vs. 'Sonny' Wilson" from Shut Down Volume 2 and "Our Favorite Recording Sessions" from All Summer Long.

Background

The track is a recording of an informal interview of the Beach Boys by Earl Leaf. Al Jardine is not present during the interview, although the other four members are; also present is Brian Wilson's wife, Marilyn. Its runtime, which is 2 minutes and 10 seconds long, is only an excerpt from the interview which lasts 20 minutes and 12 seconds. It is unreleased but has been made available through bootlegs.

Mike Love commented in a 2022 interview,

Reception

Despite the glowing reception for the rest of The Beach Boys Today!, "Bull Session with the 'Big Daddy is largely regarded as filler. Scott Interrante of PopMatters described it as a "filler chatter track" and said that "over the two minutes, very little of substance is said, and one seriously questions why it was included at all," concluding that "I think we can all agree that the album would be better off without it." Author Andrew Hickey described the track as "the most pointless thing in the band's discography." Writer Keith Badman called the track "bizarre."

Personnel

The Beach Boys
Mike Love, Brian Wilson, Carl Wilson, Dennis Wilson

Guests
Earl Leaf, Marilyn Wilson

References

Song recordings produced by Brian Wilson
The Beach Boys songs
1965 songs
Interviews